The Sawyer Skyjacker II is an American homebuilt aircraft that was designed and produced by Ralph V. Sawyer of Lancaster, California, in 1974.  It first flew on 3 July 1975. The aircraft was intended as a research project and as such only one was built.

Design and development
The Skyjacker II was designed to explore ultra-low aspect ratio wing designs and in particular the stability, controllability and capability of the configuration. The design was intended to be easily scalable to much larger aircraft. It has no complex curves and was designed to be easy to construct. It features a cantilever mid-wing, a two-seats-in-tandem enclosed cockpit under a glazed canopy, fixed tricycle landing gear with wheel pants and a single engine in pusher configuration.

The aircraft is made from sheet aluminum, has an  span wing and is powered by a  Lycoming IO-360-A1B6D engine.

The aircraft proved to be stall and spin proof.

The sole example built was registered in the United States with the Federal Aviation Administration in 1974, but its registration was cancelled in August 2013.

Specifications (Skyjacker II)

References

External links
Photos of the Sykjacker in 2010
Photos of the Skyjacker

Skyjacker II
1970s United States experimental aircraft
Single-engined pusher aircraft
Mid-wing aircraft
Homebuilt aircraft
Aircraft first flown in 1975